The Schools of Public Engagement is one of the academic divisions that compose The New School, a private research university located in the Greenwich Village neighborhood of New York City. The college is split into five schools; Milano School of Policy, Management, and Environment; the School of Media Studies; the Julien J. Studley Graduate Programs in International Affairs; the Creative Writing Program; and the Bachelor’s Program for Adults and Transfer Students.

History 
The Schools of Public Engagement, founded in 1919, is the direct successor of the original institution, making it the oldest divisions of The New School. The school's founding members wanted to create a “center for discussion and instruction for mature men and women,” and by 1934 it was chartered as a university by the state of New York and began conferring degrees. The division was restructured in September 2011 to include both the Milano School of Management and Urban Policy and what was then called The New School for General Studies.

Growth and change
Dean Allen Austill led the division from the 1960s to the 1980s. He was assisted by Albert Landa, who directed publicity for the New School and helped expand the university during a financial crisis, and Wallis Osterholz, who for forty-five years was responsible for much of the day-to-day administration. Austill also added areas such as guitar study and culinary science to the curriculum. In 1962, Austill initiated the Institute for Retired Professionals, a community of peer learners aged 50 to 90 who develop and participate in challenging discussion groups; the institute, now headed by Michael Markowitz, still exists today. Austill's subordinate as Chair of Humanities for many of these years was Reuben Abel, a philosopher. Abel was succeeded by Lewis Falb, a specialist in interwar Paris who broadened the humanities curriculum further. Prominent teachers in this era included the philosopher Paul Edwards; the literary scholars Hasye Cooperman, Justus Rosenberg, and Margaret Boe Birns; the political scientist Ralph Buultjens; and the visual arts instructors Anthony Toney, Minoru Kawabata, and Henry C. Pearson.

The 1990s and after 
The New School, for most of its history, operated as a noncredit institution, serving largely white, middle-class, often politically progressive, often Jewish adults living in Manhattan who were interested in intellectual stimulation and self-improvement. In the early 1990s, the institution, sensing demographic changes and needing to supplement its revenue, began to encourage credit students to matriculate at the institution, a trend which culminated in the establishment of the adult BA program in the mid-1990s. The credit students generally represented a younger and more diverse population.

Several important developments occurred at the institution in the early 2000s. A strong advising program guided the curriculum's transformation from an intellectual free-for-all of courses often taught by teachers with sharply varying credentials to a smaller, more rigorous set of offerings taught by professionals, often bearing the highest degree in their fields. In 2005, as part of the rebranding of the entire university envisioned by President Bob Kerrey, the division was renamed The New School for General Studies, to clarify its mission and perhaps to invite comparisons with Columbia University's prestigious, similarly named School of General Studies. Also in 2005, the New School agreed to a contract with Local 7902 of ACT-UAW, an affiliate of the United Auto Workers, guaranteeing job security to part-time faculty who had taught at The New School for more than ten semesters.

Following the part-time faculty's success in gaining recognition and security, New School students set about creating a university-wide representative body. Many efforts had been made to establish a student legislative body, to address student grievances and concerns, but they were stymied by disconnected university divisions and an unenthusiastic administration. However, the long-standing efforts finally paid off in the Fall 2006 term when a University-wide Student Senate was formed involving representatives from all of the school's divisions. The USS gained administration support and funding from the board of trustees and is set to ratify a new constitution. Beginning during the Spring 2007 semester, representatives were elected from each division.

Since July 2014, the Schools of Public Engagement have been led by executive dean Mary R. Watson.

Today, several undergraduate and graduate programs at the Schools of Public Engagement at The New School can be completed entirely online or through a combination of online and on-campus study.

Academics 
The Schools of Public Engagement offers Bachelor of Fine Arts (BFA), Bachelor of Arts (BA), Bachelor of Science (BS), Master of Fine Arts (MFA), Master of Arts (MA), and Doctor of Philosophy (Ph.D.) degrees. It offers undergraduate programs designed specifically for transfer students, including working adults of all ages, as well as graduate and certificate programs.

The Schools of Public Engagement houses a prestigious MFA program in creative writing, directed by Luis Jaramillo, that has featured such authors as Robert Frost, Frank O'Hara, Marguerite Young, Mira Jacob, and Camille Rankine as instructors.

The division also houses an MA/MS program in International Affairs, directed by Sakiko Fukuda-Parr, and, until 2007, hosted the World Policy Institute, a well-regarded foundation devoted to the study of foreign affairs and formerly led by Stephen Schlesinger.

SPE also offers open-enrollment continuing education courses and certificate programs including Media Management, Film Production, Organization Development, and English as a Second Language.

See also 
 The New School 
 Milano School of Policy, Management, and Environment

See also
 Education in New York City
 The New York Intellectuals
 The New York Foundation
 Project Pericles
 National Book Award

References 

General Studies
Liberal arts colleges in New York City
Universities and colleges in New York City